Fyodor Gavrilov was a Russian painter active in the second half of the eighteenth century.  The Tver Regional Picture Gallery contains a single painting by him, a portrait of Nikita Kuzhin which it accessioned in 1950; a label formerly affixed to the back of the painting dates it to 1767. Nothing further is recorded of his career.

References

18th-century painters from the Russian Empire
Russian male painters
Year of birth missing
Year of death missing